Manuel Silvela y Le Vielleuze KStJ (9 March 1830, in Paris, Kingdom of France – 25 May 1892, in Madrid, Kingdom of Spain) was a Spanish politician, lawyer, writer and journalist who held several importante governmental offices, such as Minister of State and Councillor of State.

Silvela was son of the prominent lawyer Francisco Agustín Silvela y Blanco and wife Luisa de le Vielleuze y Sotés, and brother of the also politician Francisco Silvela.

Decorations and awards
He was awarded the Collar of the Order of Charles III and the Grand Cross of the Légion d'Honneur, Knight of the Order of Pius IX, the Order of the Red Eagle, Order of Saints Maurice and Lazarus, Knight of the Order of Leopold (Belgium), Order of Leopold (Austria), Grand Cross of the Order of the Immaculate Conception of Vila Viçosa, the Order of the Rose, Grand Cross of the Order of St. Olav, the Grand Cross of the Order of the Zähringer Lion, the Order of the Lion and the Sun, Order of Burma, Knight of Honour of the Sovereign Military Order of Malta and Order of St. Charles, among others.

Works
Sin Nombre (1868), Recopilación de artículos literarios.
 Reseña analítica de las obras póstumas del memorable dramaturgo, reformador de nuestro teatro (1868)
 Le Jury Criminel en Espagne (Montpellier, 1884)
 Obras completas de Moratín, con notas y comentarios (Madrid, 1890)
 El bautizo de un libro
 El perfecto novelista
 Un verano de Felipe V
 Recuerdos de Extremadura
 Revista cantábrica (1869)
 Salir de Madrid (1851)
 La Alcarria
 Mañanas de La Granja
 Revista del Escorial
 Variaciones fáciles 
 Sobre el conocido tema "El amor y el matrimonio"
 Un viaje por regiones desconocidas
 De la influencia de las construcciones modernas en la literatura
 De Madrid a Sevilla y Cádiz
 Literatura infinitesimal
 El abogado de pobres
 Revista de La Granja
 Cuatro capítulos de una novela inédita
 Desde Madrid a Toledo (1854)
 El castillo de <<aunque os pese>>
 Una Dalia y un puntapié
 La Opera y el Gobierno (1865)
 Apuntes críticos acerca de las poesías de Baeza, y por incidencia de las condiciones literarias del siglo
 El diccionario y la gastronomía
 Miscelánea
 La prensa ilustrada
 Un ukase
 Revista de la exposición de Bellas Artes (1868)
 Juicio crítico de la Restauración en 1881
 Los dineros del sacristán
 Al amor de la lumbre
 Negro y blanco (1851)
 La via sacra
 Recuerdos de Spa
 Disertación acerca de la influencia ejercida en el idioma y en el teatro español por la escuela clásica que floreció desde los comienzos del S.XVIII
 Un talego del Estado o el estado de un talego
 Sobre el diccionario de la Real Academia Española
 Fin de una polémica
 Ultimas palabras sobre una polémica
 En las aguas de Spa (1887)
 ¡Viva Galicia!

Sources
Spanish Senate. Personal dossier of D. Manuel Silvela

|-
 

1830 births
1892 deaths
Liberal Union (Spain) politicians
Conservative Party (Spain) politicians
Foreign ministers of Spain
Members of the Congress of Deputies (Spain)
Members of the Congress of Deputies of the Spanish Restoration
Members of the Senate of Spain
Ambassadors of Spain to France
Knights of the Order of Pope Pius IX
Grand Croix of the Légion d'honneur
Knights Grand Cross of the Order of Saints Maurice and Lazarus
Knights Grand Cross of the Order of the Immaculate Conception of Vila Viçosa
Recipients of the Order of Saint-Charles
Knights of the Order of St John